Croydon North East was a borough constituency represented in the House of Commons of the Parliament of the United Kingdom from 1955 to 1997. It elected one Member of Parliament (MP) by the first past the post system of election.

History 

Croydon North East was created for the 1955 general election just five years after a previous re-organisation of the three seats in the County Borough of Croydon. It took in areas of the former Croydon North and Croydon East constituencies and bordered Croydon North West and Croydon South, as well as, when originally created, the constituency of Beckenham.

The constituency was abolished at the 1997 general election with one third going to the new Croydon North seat (the Thornton Heath, Upper Norwood and South Norwood wards) and the rest (the wards of Woodside, Rylands, Addiscombe, Ashburton and Monks Orchard) becoming part of an expanded Croydon Central.

For all of its history, Croydon North East had Conservative Members of Parliament, although in 1987 its long-serving and most notable MP, Bernard Weatherill, stood as Speaker. Following its abolition at the 1997 election both successor seats elected Labour MPs.

Boundaries 
1955–1965: The County Borough of Croydon wards of Addiscombe, East, South Norwood, Thornton Heath, and Woodside.

1965–1983: The same wards in the London Borough of Croydon.

1983–1997: Wards of the above borough: Addiscombe, Ashburton, Monks Orchard, Rylands, South Norwood, Thornton Heath, Upper Norwood, and Woodside.

When first created, Croydon North East included the areas of South Norwood and Addiscombe and parts of Thornton Heath and Shirley. It saw various boundary changes, largely stretching further north. At the time of its abolition in 1997, Croydon North East covered all of South Norwood, Upper Norwood, Addiscombe, northern Shirley and parts of Thornton Heath around Thornton Heath High Street, within the London Borough of Croydon.

Members of Parliament

Elections

See also
List of parliamentary constituencies in London

Notes and references

Sources 

Politics of the London Borough of Croydon
Parliamentary constituencies in London (historic)
History of the London Borough of Croydon
Constituencies of the Parliament of the United Kingdom established in 1955
Constituencies of the Parliament of the United Kingdom disestablished in 1997